Keye van der Vuurst de Vries (born 29 December 2001) is a Dutch basketball player for Filou Oostende of the BNXT League. He is the youngest player to ever play in the Netherlands national basketball team, as he made his debut at age 16.

Early life and career 
Throughout his childhood, Van der Vuurst de Vries played with the amateur team Lokomotief, in his hometown Rijswijk. In 2017, he signed with Belgian club BC Oostende, where he played for the youth teams as well for Duva Fruit.

Professional career 
Van der Vuurst de Vries made his debut with BC Oostende in the 2018–19 Pro Basketball League season. For the following 2019–20 season, he was given a permanent spot on Oostende's roster. He won three consecutive Pro Basketball League championships with Oostende. On 27 May 2022, he won his fourth consecutive Belgian championship and was named the Finals MVP after averaging 9 points and 7.8 assists in the series against Kangoeroes.

On April 26, 2022, he declared for the 2022 NBA draft.

National team career

Junior teams
In 2018, Van der Vuurst de Vries won the 2018 FIBA Europe Under-18 Championship Division B while playing with the Dutch under-18 team. He scored a game-high 35 points in the final, in which Slovenia was defeated easily by 86–57.

Senior team
On 16 November 2018, van der Vuurst was selected by head coach Toon van Helfteren to be a part of the Netherlands senior team. On 29 November 2018, Van der Vuurst de Vries made his debut for the Netherlands at age 16, making him the youngest player ever to play for the Dutch team. He surpassed the record set in 1961 by Ger Kok. In his debut game, the Netherlands played Poland, and lost 78–105.

Personal
Keye is the younger brother of Boyd, who plays professional basketball for Okapi Aalst.

Honours

Club
Oostende
3× Pro Basketball League / BNXT Belgian Champions: 2018–19, 2019–20, 2020–21, 2021–22
Belgian Cup: 2020–21
Belgian Basketball Supercup: 2018
2× BNXT Supercup: 2021, 2022

Individual
BNXT Belgian Finals MVP: 2022

References

2001 births
Living people
BC Oostende players
Dutch men's basketball players
People from Rijswijk
Point guards
Sportspeople from South Holland
Dutch expatriate basketball people in Belgium